Arnognathus is an extinct genus of non-mammalian synapsids.

See also

 List of therapsids

References

 The main groups of non-mammalian synapsids at Mikko's Phylogeny Archive

Prehistoric synapsid genera
Lopingian synapsids of Africa
Fossil taxa described in 1907
Taxa named by Robert Broom